Anna Levkovets (born 25 May 2007) is a Kazakhstani figure skater. She is the 2022 CS Denis Ten Memorial Challenge silver medalist and the 2021 Kazakhstani national champion.

Personal life 
Levkovets was born on 25 May 2007 in Karaganda, Kazakhstan.

Programs

Competitive highlights 
CS: Challenger Series; JGP: Junior Grand Prix.

References

External links 
 

2007 births
Living people
Kazakhstani female single skaters
Sportspeople from Astana
Sportspeople from Karaganda